White Magic for Lovers is the second studio album released by the London-based band Drugstore. It reached the UK albums chart at number 45. The album was noted for the "Song for Pessoa", about the Portuguese modernist poet Fernando Pessoa, "The Funeral" and the song "El President", a duet between Isabel Monteiro and Radiohead's Thom Yorke, which reached the UK singles chart at number 20.

Track listing
All tracks written by Isabel Monteiro; except "Sober" by Daron Robinson and Monteiro, "Never Come Down" by Robinson, and "Tips for Travelling" by Mike Chylinski.

Personnel
Personnel per booklet.

Drugstore
 Daron Robinson – guitar, vocals
 Isabel Monteiro – vocals, bass
 Mike Chylinski – drums
 Ian Burdge – cello

Additional musicians
 Thom Yorke – vocals on "El President"
 The Mariachi Band of Orlando Rincon – "Say Hello"
 Terry Edwards – horns on "Never Come Down"
 Mike Kearsey – horns on "Never Come Down"
 Ollie Kraus – cello on "I Know I Could" and "I Don't Wanna Be Here Without You"
 James Banbury – cello on "Mondo Cane"; keyboards on "Never Come Down" and "The Funeral (But Most of All)"
 Kathleen Chylinski – violin on "Tips for Travelling"

Production
 Clive Martin – producer, recording
 Drugstore – producer
 Paul Reed – house engineer
 Lee Butler – house engineer
 Doug Cook – house engineer
 Adi Winman – house engineer
 Tom Rixton – house engineer
 Lem Lattimer – house engineer
 Ray Lombard – band shots
 Andy Willsher – centrefold
 Isabel Monteiro – artwork, voodoo dolls

Charts

References

External links
'Les Inrockuptibles' Albums of the Year List 1998 – Critics choice top 50 albums – ranked 42 (bottom-page)
'FFWD Magazine' issue June 18 1998 – album review

1998 albums
Drugstore (band) albums
Roadrunner Records albums